Iain MacDonald Sproat (8 November 1938 – 29 September 2011) was a British Conservative Member of Parliament (MP). He was educated at Winchester College and Magdalen College, Oxford. He worked as a publisher and journalist.

Parliamentary career
Sproat first contested Rutherglen in a by-election in May 1964, and again in the general election later that year, but was unsuccessful in both campaigns.

At the 1970 general election, he stood in the marginal Scottish constituency of Aberdeen South, and ousted the sitting Labour MP, Donald Dewar. He was re-elected there at three further elections, until the 1983 general election when he moved to contest Roxburgh and Berwickshire believing that this was a 'safer' seat. However, Aberdeen South was held by the Conservatives, while Roxburgh and Berwickshire fell to the Liberal candidate Archy Kirkwood.

Sproat returned to Parliament nine years later, moving to England and succeeding Sir Julian Ridsdale as MP for Harwich in the 1992 general election. He served as Minister for Sport in John Major's government from 1993 to 1997, but at the 1997 general election he was defeated by the Labour candidate Ivan Henderson. Sproat stood again in Harwich at the 2001 election, but Henderson was returned with an increased majority. Sproat did not contest the 2005 general election; instead Douglas Carswell regained the seat for the Conservatives.

Outside Parliament
In 1979 he married Judith Mary Kernot, who survived him.

A lifelong cricket fan, in 1980 he was founder publisher of the Cricketers' Who's Who (Green Umbrella) which celebrated its 43rd anniversary in 2022.

A tireless campaigner to clear the name of his literary hero, P.G. Wodehouse, he secured Wodehouse's knighthood in 1975 and later wrote 'Wodehouse at War' (pub Milner & Co. Ltd. 1981) claiming the author's innocence regarding charges that he acted as a propagandist for Nazi Germany during World War II.

References

External links
 

1938 births
2011 deaths
People educated at St. Mary's School, Melrose
Alumni of Magdalen College, Oxford
Conservative Party (UK) MPs for English constituencies
Members of the Parliament of the United Kingdom for Aberdeen constituencies
Scottish Conservative Party MPs
People educated at Winchester College
UK MPs 1970–1974
UK MPs 1974
UK MPs 1974–1979
UK MPs 1979–1983
UK MPs 1992–1997